Ari Shavit (born 16 November 1957) is an Israeli reporter and writer. Shavit was a senior correspondent at the left-of-center Israeli newspaper Haaretz before he resigned when a pattern of sexual misconduct came to public attention.

A self-described left-wing journalist and anti-occupation peacenik, Shavit is the author of the 2013 New York Times Best Seller My Promised Land: The Triumph and Tragedy of Israel.

Biography
Shavit was born in Rehovot, Israel, and studied at the Hebrew University in Jerusalem. His father was a scientist and his mother was an artist. Some of his ancestors were early leading Zionists.

Shavit was drafted into the Israel Defense Forces in 1975. He volunteered as a paratrooper in the Paratroopers Brigade. He served as a squad leader and took part in various raids against armed Palestinian organizations and camps in Lebanon, including Operation Litani.

Career
Known for his left-wing journalism,
Shavit has been a columnist for Haaretz since 1995. His work has also appeared in The New Yorker, The New York Times, and Politico.

Shavit describes himself as an "antioccupation peacenik". He is particularly critical of right-wing Israeli politicians, such as Avigdor Lieberman, who he argues is only loyal to Russia and to Putin. Shavit is also critical of Miri Regev, describing her as 'anti-culture', and of Ayelet Shaked, describing her as 'anti-democracy'.

He has for many years been a critic of Benjamin Netanyahu.  Although admitting that Netanyahu is highly intelligent, Shavit argues that Netanyahu "scorns [US] Democrat politicians and liberal intellectuals... as weaklings." Shavit also castigates Netanyahu for not being "a civil leader who truly cares for the welfare of his citizens. He [Netanyahu] is unconcerned by social justice."

In 2013, Shavit released My Promised Land: The Triumph and Tragedy of Israel. It was a New York Times Best Seller and received widespread acclaim. The New York Times listed My Promised Land in its "100 Notable Books of 2013", The Economist named it as one of the best books of 2013, it received the Gerrard and Ella Berman Memorial Award in History from the Jewish Book Council, and it won the Natan Book Award. In September 2014, Shavit traveled to Cleveland, Ohio to accept the Anisfield-Wolf Book Award in nonfiction for My Promised Land, and delivered a talk at the Cleveland City Club about the necessity of American leadership in the Middle East. The book received many positive reviews, as well as criticism from both the left, including from Norman Finkelstein, and from the right, including from Martin Kramer.

Resignation
In 2016, charges of sexual misconduct involving groping of women in the workplace surfaced, forcing Shavit to apologize and resign from his positions at Haaretz and Channel 10.

Shavit was temporarily suspended from the Haaretz newspaper after he was accused of sexual harassment by American-Jewish journalist Danielle Berrin ('Hollywood Jew'),  who wrote a cover story on the subject in the Los Angeles Jewish Journal. Shavit, initially claimed the incident was merely flirting, saying "I apologize from the bottom of my heart for this misunderstanding. I did not mean to say anything unwelcome to Berrin". In response, Shelly Yachimovich wrote: "I don't know if Berrin accepted his apology, but I didn't... It's not like he accidentally stepped on somebody's toe." In response to the allegations, Shavit announced that he was taking time off from his journalism.

A member of the staff of the Jewish organization J Street then stepped forward to say that while she was arranging speaking engagements for Shavit he had caressed her hand and propositioned her with the suggestion that they go out for drinks.   Shavit then resigned.

Bibliography

Books

Essays and reporting

Critical studies and reviews of Shavit's work

References

External links

 Official website
 Ari Shavit: Apocalypse now, apocalypse forever
 
 
 Saving the Promised Land, Fathom: For a deeper understanding of Israel and the region, 2 June 2014
 Ari Shavit: Triumph by treachery towards the Promised Land

1957 births
Living people
Hebrew University of Jerusalem alumni
Israeli columnists
Israeli non-fiction writers
People from Rehovot
Haaretz people
The New Yorker people